Mihai Cristian Stoichiță (born 10 May 1954) is a Romanian football manager who last coached Liga I side Petrolul Ploiești.

Coaching career 
Stoichiță joined Steaua București in 1994 as an assistant coach under Dumitru Dumitriu. When Dumitriu stepped down at the beginning of the 1997–98 season, Stoichiță became head coach. He led the team to the league title, and followed this success by winning the 1998 Supercupa României.

Stoichiță led Panama to a fourth-place ranking at the 2001 UNCAF Nations Cup held in Honduras. The Kuwait Football Association hired him in 2006 to coach its national football team. Stoichiţă's was tasked to earn one point from the away match at Uzbekistan to qualify for a two-legged play-off against Bahrain in the World Cup Qualifiers. Despite leading with two goals after the first 30 minutes, Bahrain lost 2-3 and was eliminated from the World Cup.

On 18 September 2009, two hours after Cristiano Bergodi was sacked, he was announced by Steaua București's owner, Gigi Becali, as the new manager of the team. He resigned in May 2010, after finishing the 2009–10 season on the fourth position. In June 2010, Stoichiţă joined Astra Ploiești but was sacked after only a couple of months due to poor results. He returned to Cyprus, for a second spell at AEL Limassol.

In September 2011, Stoichiţă returned to Romania to help newly promoted CS Mioveni in their attempt to avoid relegation, but an offer from Apollon Limassol made him move back to Cyprus. At the beginning of March 2012, he ended his contract and returned to Romania. On 27 March 2012, he returned to Steaua, signing a contract until the end of the season. His contract wasn't renewed because he failed to win the title with Steaua.

Honours
Player

Jiul Petroşani
Romanian Cup: 1
1974

Manager

Steaua București
Romanian League: 1
1998
Romanian Super Cup: 1
1998

Sheriff Tiraspol
Moldovan National Division: 1
2002
Moldovan Cup: 1
2002

Pyunik Yerevan
Armenian Premier League: 1
2004
Armenian Cup: 1
2004
Armenian Super Cup: 1
2004

References

External links
 

1954 births
Living people
Footballers from Bucharest
Romanian footballers
Association football midfielders
Romania under-21 international footballers
Liga I players
CSM Jiul Petroșani players
AFC Rocar București players
FC Progresul București players
FC Gloria Buzău players
Romanian football managers
FC Progresul București managers
AFC Rocar București managers
FC Steaua București assistant managers
FC Steaua București managers
PFC Litex Lovech managers
Panama national football team managers
FC Sheriff Tiraspol managers
Süper Lig managers
MKE Ankaragücü managers
Armenia national football team managers
FC Pyunik managers
FCV Farul Constanța managers
ASC Oțelul Galați managers
Kuwait national football team managers
Aris Limassol FC managers
AEL Limassol managers
FC Astra Giurgiu managers
CS Mioveni managers
Apollon Limassol FC managers
FC Petrolul Ploiești managers
Romanian expatriate football managers
Romanian expatriate sportspeople in Armenia
Expatriate football managers in Armenia
Romanian expatriate sportspeople in Bulgaria
Expatriate football managers in Bulgaria
Romanian expatriate sportspeople in Cyprus
Expatriate football managers in Cyprus
Romanian expatriate sportspeople in Kuwait
Expatriate football managers in Kuwait
Romanian expatriate sportspeople in Moldova
Expatriate football managers in Moldova
Romanian expatriate sportspeople in Turkey
Expatriate football managers in Turkey
Moldovan Super Liga managers
Al-Salmiya SC managers
Kuwait Premier League managers